Quebec student protests may refer to:
 1996 Quebec student protests, in response to government plans to unfreeze university tuition costs
 2005 Quebec student protests, in response to budget cuts in the Grants and Loans program
 2012 Quebec student protests, in response to an increase in tuition fees